Karl Brandan Mollweide (3 February 1774 – 10 March 1825) was a German mathematician and astronomer who taught in Halle and Leipzig. In trigonometry, he rediscovered the formula now known as Mollweide's formula. He invented a map projection called the Mollweide projection.

References

External links
 

1774 births

1825 deaths
People from Wolfenbüttel
People from the Duchy of Brunswick
19th-century German mathematicians
Members of the Göttingen Academy of Sciences and Humanities